The following tables compare general and technical features of notable email client programs.

General
Basic general information about the clients: creator/company, O/S, licence, & interface. Clients listed on a light purple background are no longer in active development.

Release history
A brief digest of the release histories.

Operating system support
The operating systems on which the clients can run natively (without emulation).

Protocol support

Communication and access protocol support

What email and related protocols and standards are supported by each client.

Integration protocol support

Authentication support

SSL and TLS support

Features

Information on what features each of the clients support.

General features

For all of these clients, the concept of "HTML support" does not mean that they can process the full range of HTML that a web browser can handle. Almost all email readers limit HTML features, either for security reasons, or because of the nature of the interface. CSS and JavaScript can be especially problematic.

Messages features

Database, folders and customization

Templates, scripts and programming languages

Internationalization
The Bat! supports Email Address Internationalization (EAI).

As of October 2016, email clients supporting SMTPUTF8 included Outlook 2016, mail for iOS, and mail for Android.

See also
Comparison of feed aggregators
Comparison of browser engines
Comparison of mail servers
Comparison of webmail providers
List of personal information managers
Unicode and email
Webmail

References

External links
T&B : Email : Clients (of historical interest—last updated in 1999)
Mail User Agents for Linux Based Platforms (includes many email clients not listed in the above tables)
Remail - research by The Collaborative User Experience group at IBM

Email clients
 

sv:E-postprogram#Jämförelse av epostklienter